Each national team has to submit a squad of 18 players, two of whom must be goalkeepers.

Players in boldface have since been capped at full international level.

Ages are as of the start of the tournament, 11 July 2016.

Group A

Germany
On 15 June 2016, Germany announced a 23-man preliminary list. On 7 July 2016, Germany announced the final squad.

Head coach: Guido Streichsbier

Italy
On 7 July 2016, Italy announced the final squad.

Head coach: Paolo Vanoli

Austria
Head coach: Rupert Marko

Portugal
On 16 June 2016, Portugal announced 23-man preliminary list. On 7 July, Peixe announced the final squad.

Head coach: Emílio Peixe

Group B

Croatia
On 27 June 2016, Croatia announced a 25-man preliminary list.

Head coach: Ferdo Milin

Netherlands
On 28 June 2016, Netherlands announced a 24-man preliminary list.

Head coach: Aron Winter

France
On 6 July 2016, France announced their final squad.

Head coach: Ludovic Batelli

England
On 6 July 2016, England announced their final squad.

Head coach: Aidy Boothroyd

1. Tafari Moore was called up during the tournament due to an injury to Callum Connolly.

Notes

References

2016 UEFA European Under-19 Championship
UEFA European Under-19 Championship squads